This is a partial list of parks and open spaces in the county of Derbyshire in England. It includes urban parks, country parks, woodlands, commons, lakes, local nature reserves and other green spaces that are open to the public.

Parks and open spaces in Derbyshire

See also 

 List of public art in Derbyshire
List of Sites of Special Scientific Interest in Derbyshire
Derbyshire Wildlife Trust - List of nature reserves
 Recreational walks in Derbyshire

References 

Derbyshire
 
Parks